This is a list of rural localities in Krasnoyarsk Krai. Krasnoyarsk Krai is a federal subject of Russia (a krai), with its administrative center in the city of Krasnoyarsk—the third-largest city in Siberia (after Novosibirsk and Omsk). Comprising half of the Siberian Federal District, Krasnoyarsk Krai is the largest krai in the Russian Federation, the second largest federal subject (after the neighboring Sakha Republic) and the third largest subnational governing body by area in the world, after Sakha and the Australian state of Western Australia.

Abansky District 
Rural localities in Abansky District:

 Aban

Birilyussky District 
Rural localities in Birilyussky District:

 Novobirilyussy

Boguchansky District 
Rural localities in Boguchansky District:

 Boguchany

Bolsheuluysky District 
Rural localities in Bolsheuluysky District:

 Bolshoy Uluy

Dzerzhinsky District 
Rural localities in Dzerzhinsky District:

 Dzerzhinskoye

Evenkiysky District 
Rural localities in Evenkiysky District:

 Baykit
 Poligus
 Tura
 Vanavara
 Yessey

Idrinsky District 
Rural localities in Idrinsky District:

 Idrinskoye
 Zezezino

Ilansky District 
Rural localities in Ilansky District:

 Abakumovka

Irbeysky District 
Rural localities in Irbeysky District:

 Irbeyskoye

Karatuzsky District 
Rural localities in Karatuzsky District:

 Karatuzskoye
 Nizhnyaya Bulanka

Kazachinsky District 
Rural localities in Kazachinsky District:

 Kazachinskoye

Krasnoturansky District 
Rural localities in Krasnoturansky District:

 Krasnoturansk

Kuraginsky District 
Rural localities in Kuraginsky District:

 Petropavlovka

Mansky District 
Rural localities in Mansky District:

 Shalinskoye

Novosyolovsky District 
Rural localities in Novosyolovsky District:

 Novosyolovo

Partizansky District 
Rural localities in Partizansky District:

 Partizanskoye

Pirovsky District 
Rural localities in Pirovsky District:

 Pirovskoye

Rybinsky District 
Rural localities in Rybinsky District:

 Loshchinka

Sayansky District 
Rural localities in Sayansky District:

 Abalakovo
 Aginskoye

Severo-Yeniseysky District 
Rural localities in Severo-Yeniseysky District:

 Teya

Shushensky District 
Rural localities in Shushensky District:

 Kazantsevo

Sukhobuzimsky District 
Rural localities in Sukhobuzimsky District:

 Sukhobuzimskoye

Taseyevsky District 
Rural localities in Taseyevsky District:

 Taseyevo

Taymyrsky Dolgano-Nenetsky District 
Rural localities in Taymyrsky Dolgano-Nenetsky District:

 Khatanga
 Popigay
 Volochanka

Turukhansky District 
Rural localities in Turukhansky District:

 Bor
 Kellog
 Kureika
 Mirnoye
 Podkamennaya Tunguska
 Turukhansk
 Yanov Stan

Tyukhtetsky District 
Rural localities in Tyukhtetsky District:

 Tyukhtet

Yeniseysky District 
Rural localities in Yeniseysky District:

 Abalakovo

Yermakovsky District 
Rural localities in Yermakovsky District:

 Yermakovskoye

Zheleznogorsk 
Rural localities in Zheleznogorsk:

 Dodonovo

See also 
 
 Lists of rural localities in Russia

References 

Krasnoyarsk Krai